Saga Rail was a short-lived open access operator in Sweden. It was founded by Mats Nyblom who had previously established Hector Rail. It commenced operations on 23 February 2018 with a twice weekly service from Stockholm to Linköping with intermediate stops at Nyköping and Norrköping.

Four former X10 electric multiple units were acquired from Storstockholms Lokaltrafik and painted in a pink livery.

Operations ceased in June 2018 after Saga Rail lost an appeal with the Swedish Competition Authority over SJ's refusal to sell its tickets on its website.

References

Railway companies established in 2018
Railway companies disestablished in 2018
2018 establishments in Sweden
2018 disestablishments in Sweden